Landacre Bridge carries Landacre Lane across the River Barle near Withypool on Exmoor in the English county of Somerset. It has been scheduled as an ancient monument  and Grade II* listed building.

It has pointed arches with cutwaters.

It was built in the late medieval period with the first documentary evidence being from 1610. Restoration work was undertaken in 1875, and again following damage during flooding in 1952.

The grassy banks are grazed by sheep and provide an environment for Montbretia, Ivy-leaved Bellflower  and Bottle Sedge, with the wetter areas supporting  Bog-bean, Marsh Speedwell, Bog Asphodel and Round-leaved Sundew. The river itself has populations of Watermilfoil and the hybrid between Monkeyflower and Blood-drop-emlets.

The bridge has also given its name to a Morris Dance by Exmoor Border Morris, which they performed at the bridge in 2016.

References

Bridges in Somerset
Exmoor
Grade II* listed buildings in West Somerset
Scheduled monuments in West Somerset
Grade II* listed bridges in England
Stone bridges in England
Arch bridges in the United Kingdom